Team Rubicon is an international non-government organization (NGO) specializing in disaster response.

History
Team Rubicon was formed in January 2010 following the Haiti earthquake, when William McNulty and Jacob "Jake" Wood led a medical team into Port-au-Prince three days after the earthquake. The first Team Rubicon was an initial team of eight. They gathered funds and medical supplies from friends and family and flew into the Dominican Republic. They rented a truck, loaded their gear, and headed west to Haiti. The team treated thousands of patients, traveling to camps deemed “too dangerous” by other aid organizations. They ventured outside the traditional scale of disaster response, focusing on those who would be overlooked and left untreated.

That experience was the beginning of Team Rubicon. Team Rubicon wanted to solve two problems: (1) Inadequate disaster response which is often slow to respond, has an antiquated infrastructure and is not using the best technological solutions or well-trained members, and (2) inadequate veteran reintegration into civilian life. Military veterans' training, skills, and experience make them well suited to disaster response while helping others can promote healing and community to alleviate some of the reintegration issues that drive a high suicide rate among veterans.

The death of fellow Rubicon member Clay Hunt from suicide redoubled Team Rubicon's organizational mission towards veteran reintegration. The team's role in domestic disasters is both to provide humanitarian assistance and to provide veterans an opportunity to continue to serve.

The name "Rubicon" is from the phrase "crossing the Rubicon," an idiom to mean passing a point of no return. The red and dark brown logo is made up of a sideways cross, a traditional symbol of first aid but here on its side as a departure from the traditional, with a river running through the logo, as a symbol of the gap between disasters and disaster relief.

Wood and his work with Team Rubicon were profiled alongside fellow vet Eric Greitens and The Mission Continues founder as the subject of Time columnist Joe Klein's 2015 book, Charlie Mike.

J.J. Watt, defensive end for the Houston Texans, raised an unexpected $37 million towards the Hurricane Harvey relief efforts, and so consulted SBP, a disaster relief organization based in New Orleans, and Team Rubicon for how to best spend the funds.

Scope of work 
Since the Haiti earthquake, Team Rubicon has deployed on over 500 operations including international operations in Pakistan (2010 Pakistan floods), Chile (2010 Chile tsunami), Burma (2010 Thai-Burma border conflict), Sudan, Ecuador, Nepal, Greece, and Turkey and Hurricane Dorian in the Bahamas.

Domestically, Team Rubicon has responded to large-scale disasters such as Hurricane Matthew, Hurricane Irene, Tropical Storm Debby, Hurricane Isaac, Hurricane Sandy, the tornado destruction of Moore, Oklahoma., Hurricane Maria, Hurricane Florence, and Hurricane Michael. In 2019, Team Rubicon's Operation Heartlander responded to Winter Storm Ulmer that caused widespread damage across the American Midwest and provided assistance in eastern Nebraska, western Iowa, and on the Pine Ridge reservation in South Dakota.

Many of Team Rubicon's hundreds of responses are to more localized disasters such as catastrophic snowstorms, smaller tornadoes, and flooding.

With the onset of the COVID-19 epidemic, Team Rubicon USA expanded its operational focus to include feeding programs in conjunction with Food Lifeline and Feeding America and Meals on Wheels and to take individual initiative, called "Neighbors Helping Neighbors", to safely assist their fellow community members.

Team Rubicon also conducts wildfire mitigation operations that both serve as training opportunities and help protect vulnerable communities by removing potential fuels.

In 2018 Team Rubicon became the first NGO in North America to receive WHO Emergency Medical Team Type 1 Mobile certification.

Leadership 
In 2013, General (Ret.) David Petraeus joined Team Rubicon's Board of Advisors. Petraeus promoted the work of veteran reintegration, citing its importance to soldiers returning from war.

Three years later, in 2016, civil rights expert Ehsan Zaffar joined the Board of Advisors.

Additional high-profile advisors are General Stanley McChrystal, USA (Ret.) and former New York Stock Exchange CEO Duncan Niederauer, who serves on the board of directors. General James T. Conway, USMC (Ret.) and Lt Gen Russel L. Honoré, USA (Ret.) as well as private sector business people Andy Bessette from Travelers Insurance, Jeff Dailey, CEO of Farmers Group, Gregg Lemkau from Goldman Sachs, John Pitts from Kirkland & Ellis, Richard Serino, former Deputy Administrator of FEMA, and Jeff Smith from FedEx serve as advisors to Team Rubicon. Many are former military or have logistical expertise that helps guide Team Rubicon.

Additional high-profile supporters are former Presidents George W. Bush and Bill Clinton. The George W. Bush Center included Team Rubicon as one of the case studies  in its research on veteran serving nonprofits (VSNP).

In July 2021, Team Rubicon Cofounder and then-current CEO Jake Wood stepped into an Executive Chairman role. Jake left the CEO position and then-current COO Art delaCruz stepped into the CEO position.

Some international chapters of Team Rubicon were detached and re-organized into independent organizations with the same mission. For example, Team Rubicon's Norway chapter became "Response Norway".

Partnerships 
Team Rubicon is or has partnered with many US corporations to support its mission including (list is not complete):

 Got Your 6 .
 Palantir Technologies. 
 Home Depot.
 Tough Mudder.
 Jack Links.
 Pepsi and Mountain Dew.
 Carhartt.
 Merrell.
 The Guardian Life Insurance Company.

Clay Hunt Fellows Program 
The Clay Hunt Fellows Program is a leadership development fellowship created by Team Rubicon. It is named after Clay Hunt, one of the original members of Team Rubicon who suffered from PTSD and depression and committed suicide in 2011. It was founded in 2013 as a 12 month program, but has since been changed to a 6 month program. On February 12, 2015, a veteran suicide prevention bill, the Clay Hunt Suicide Prevention for American Veterans Act or the Clay Hunt SAV "Suicide Prevention for American Veterans" Act, named in his honor, became law.

Awards and honors 
 2011: GQ Foundation, Winner, Better Men Better World, Jake Wood
 2012: CNN Hero, Jake Wood
 2012: Classy Awards, National Small Charity of the Year
 2012: Grinnell Prize
 2012: Chase American Giving Awards, "Heroes and Leaders" National Award
 2015: Presidential Leadership Scholar, William McNulty
2018 Pat Tillman Award for Courage at the ESPYs, Jake Wood 
2018 Dungy-Thompson Humanitarian Award from the Big Ten Conference, Jake Wood

See also 
 Veterans of Foreign Wars
 The American Legion
 The Mission Continues

References

Further reading 
 
 
 
 
Wood, Jake (2020). Once A Warrior. New York: Sentinel. ISBN 978-0-593-18935-1

External links 

 
 Clay Hunt Fellowship Program

Humanitarian aid organizations
American veterans' organizations
Organizations established in 2010
2010 establishments in California